Isaac Anderson may refer to:

Isaac L. Anderson (1780–1857), Presbyterian minister and founder of Maryville College
Isaac Anderson (congressman) (1760–1838), member of the U.S. House of Representatives from Pennsylvania, officer in the American Revolution
Isaac Anderson (1868–1961), longtime New York journalist and mystery critic for The New York Times Book Review
Isaac H. Anderson (1834–1906), slave who became a wealthy businessman, politician and religious leader in the U.S. state of Georgia
Isaac Anderson (born 1995), British singer-songwriter. Guitarist for Louis Tomlinson.